Borderlands 5 is an anthology edited by Thomas F. Monteleone and Elizabeth Monteleone that was published in 2004 by Borderlands Press.  Including  a new story by Stephen King, the anthology featured over a dozen new horror stories.  It was also published as From the Borderlands from Warner Books.

Table of contents
"Rami Temporalis" by Gary A. Braunbeck 
"All Hands" by John R. Platt
"Faith will Make You Free" by Holly Newstein
"N0072-JKI" by Adam Corbin Fusco 
"Time for Me" by Barry Hoffman
"The Growth of Alan Ashley" by Bill Gauthier 
"The Goat" by Whitt Pond
"Prisoner 392" by Jon F. Merz 
"The Food Processor" by Michael Canfield
"Story Time with the BlueField Strangler" by John Farris
"Answering the Call" by Brian Freeman
"Smooth Operator" by Dominick Cancilla
"Father Bob and Bobby" by Whitley Strieber
"A Thing" by Barbara Malenky
"The Planting" by Bentley Little
"Infliction" by John McIlveen
"Dysfunction" by Darren O. Godfrey
"The Thing too Hideous to Describe" by David J. Schow
"Slipknot" by Brett Alexander Savory
"Magic Numbers" by Gene O'Neill
"Head Music" by Lon Prater
"Around it Still the Sumac Grows" by Tom Piccirilli
"Annabell" by L. Lynn Young
"One of those weeks" by Bev Vincent
"Stationary Bike" by Stephen King

References

2004 anthologies
Horror anthologies